Henri Koudossou (born 3 September 1999) is a German professional footballer who plays as a midfielder for Austrian Bundesliga club Austria Lustenau, on loan from FC Augsburg.

Career
Koudossou is a youth product of the academies of FC Ismaning and FC Memmingen. He began his senior career with the reserves of Ismaning, before moving to the German Bayernliga side SV Pullach in 2018. In the summer of 2022, he moved to FC Augsburg's reserves in the Regionalliga, and on 30 June 2022 signed a professional contract with the club for three years. On 1 September 2022, he moved to the Austrian club Austria Lustenau in the Austrian Football Bundesliga on loan for the 2022–23 season. He made his profesional debut and Austrian Bundesliga debut with Austria Lustenau as a late substitute in 1–1 tie with LASK on 11 September 2022.

Personal life
Born in Germany, Koudossou is of German and Togolese descent.

References

External links
 
 

1999 births
Living people
German people of Togolese descent
Footballers from Munich
German footballers
Association football midfielders
FC Augsburg players
FC Augsburg II players
SK Austria Klagenfurt players
Austrian Football Bundesliga players
Regionalliga players
German expatriate footballers
German expatriate sportspeople in Austria
Expatriate footballers in Austria